There are over 20,000 Grade II* listed buildings in England.  This page is a list of the 42 Grade II* listed buildings in the district of Guildford; for similar pages in relation to the other 10 districts in Surrey see Grade II* listed buildings in Surrey.



|}

Notes

References 
English Heritage Images of England

External links

Guildford
 Guildford
Borough of Guildford